Jeffrey H. Lynford (born October 7, 1947) is a financier, philanthropist and civic leader from New York currently serving as President and CEO of Educational Housing Services and as Vice Chairman of The Port Authority of New York and New Jersey. He was the co-founder of the Wellsford group of public and private companies  and has served as Chairman of three exchange-listed corporations which were taken public during his tenure. He has served on the boards of three institutions of higher learning:  New York University, NYU Tandon School of Engineering, and the School of Public and International Affairs at Princeton University.

Career
Lynford has co-founded the following firms:  
 Wellsford Residential Property Trust (NYSE:WRP) served as Chairman from 1992-1997
 Wellsford Real Properties, Inc. (AMEX:WRP) served as Chairman from 1997-2007
 Reis, Inc. (NASDAQ:REIS) served as Chairman from 2007-2010 
 Wellsford Strategic Partners LLC (2008 to present)

Corporate governance
Lynford has served on the boards of publicly reporting corporations and mutual funds as well as non-profit organizations, including:

 Citizens Budget Commission (2002 to 2008)
 Cohen & Steers: six corporate real estate mutual funds (1987 to 2001)
 Equity Residential: S&P 500 REIT (1996 to 2002)
 Global Heritage Fund (2004 to 2011)
 Lower East Side Tenement Museum (2001 to 2007)
 National Trust for Historic Preservation (1987 to 1996)
 New York State Council on the Arts (2007 to 2013)
 New York University (2008 to present)
 NYU Tandon School of Engineering (1997 to present)
 Princeton University (1994 to 2006)
 The Port Authority of New York & New Jersey (2011 to present)
 Trust for Governors Island (2010 to 2013)

Personal
He is married to Tondra Lynford; they have four children and two grandchildren.

Philanthropy
Lynford is the grantor of the Lynford Family Charitable Trust which has supported hundreds of not-for-profit organizations since its inception in 1984. 
The Trust - which focuses its giving in the areas of education and health, historic preservation, performing and visual arts, and public policy - has endowed the following fellowships Marion J. Levy, Jr. Fellowship at Princeton University, Lynford Family International Fellows at Weill Cornell Medical College, and Rising Stars at Caramoor Center for Music and the Arts. Further, the Lynford Family Charitable Trust sponsors the NYU Tandon School of Engineering Lynford Lecture Series, an annual presentation of the work of exceptional mathematicians, engineers, and scientists.

Education
Princeton University (MPA),
Fordham Law School (JD), and
University at Buffalo (BA)

References 

1947 births
Living people
American businesspeople
American founders
American philanthropists
University at Buffalo alumni